Teréz is a Hungarian feminine given name of Greek origin. It is a cognate of the English language Teresa.

Notable people named Teréz
Teréz Brunszvik (1775–1861), Hungarian noblewoman
Teréz Csillag (1859–1925), Hungarian actress
Teréz Ferenczy (1823–1853), Hungarian poet
Teréz Karacs (1808–1892), Hungarian writer, educator, memoirist, and women's rights activist

References

Hungarian feminine given names